The Electoral (Amendment) Act 1969 (No. 3) was a law of Ireland which revised Dáil constituencies. It took effect on the dissolution of the 18th Dáil on 22 May 1969 and a general election for the 19th Dáil on the revised constituencies took place on 18 June 1969.

This Act repealed the Electoral (Amendment) Act 1961, which had defined constituencies since the 1961 general election. It ended the distinction between borough constituencies in the cities of Cork and Dublin and county constituencies elsewhere.

The constituencies were also used at the general election for the 20th Dáil held on 28 February 1973.

It was itself repealed by the Electoral (Amendment) Act 1974, which created a new schedule of constituencies first used at the 1977 general election for the 21st Dáil held on 16 June 1977.

Constituencies

See also
Elections in the Republic of Ireland

References

Electoral 1969
1969 in Irish law
Acts of the Oireachtas of the 1960s